Following is a list of all Article III United States federal judges appointed by President Lyndon B. Johnson during his presidency. Johnson appointed 184 Article III federal judges, including 2 Justices to the Supreme Court of the United States, 41 to the United States Courts of Appeals, 128 to the United States district courts, 1 to the United States Court of Customs and Patent Appeals, 4 to the United States Court of Claims and 8 to the United States Customs Court.

United States Supreme Court justices

Courts of appeals

District courts

Specialty courts (Article III)

United States Court of Customs and Patent Appeals

United States Court of Claims

United States Customs Court

References
Notes

Renominations

General

 

Specific

Johnson, Lyndon B.

Presidency of Lyndon B. Johnson
Lyndon B. Johnson-related lists